In this article, the results of Al-Nassr FC Club of Saudi Arabia in 2009-2010 season is summarized

Team kit

|
|
|

Current first team squad

Saudi Professional League

Results

Kickoff times are in GMT+3.

Results summary

Results by round

Al-Nassr Standing in 2008-2009 League

King Cup of Champions

Crown Prince Cup

Round of 16

Quarterfinal

Saudi Federation cup

Group stage

Kickoff times are in GMT+3.

Group A Standing

Gulf Club Champions Cup

Group stage

Kickoff times are in GMT+3.

Group A Standing

Semi-final

First leg

Second leg

Goal scorers

Under 20 Team

Results

Results by round

Al-Nasr Standing

Under 17 Team

Results

Results by round

Al-Nasr Standing

References
kooora.com - Arabic
goalzz.com - English

Al Nassr FC seasons
Al-Nasr